The Thayer Lake East Shelter Cabin is the ruined remains of a historic backcountry shelter in the Admiralty Island National Monument, part of the Tongass National Forest in Southeast Alaska.  It was one of a number of such facilities built by Civilian Conservation Corps (CCC) on the Admiralty Island Canoe Route between 1933 and 1937.  This cabin, a three-sided Adirondack-style log structure with shake walls and roof, was built in 1936, and located on the lake near the portage trail connecting to Distin Lake.  Unlike other cabins built by the CCC on the island, which were of post-and-beam construction, in this one the logs were saddle-notched together at the corners.

The cabin was listed on the National Register of Historic Places in 1995.  It was described as lacking its roof and being derelict at the time of its listing. It does not appear on Forest Service maps unlike other shelters in the area, indicating it is closed to public use.

See also
National Register of Historic Places listings in Hoonah-Angoon Census Area, Alaska

References

Park buildings and structures on the National Register of Historic Places in Alaska
Buildings and structures completed in 1936
Log cabins in the United States
Tongass National Forest
Civilian Conservation Corps in Alaska
Buildings and structures on the National Register of Historic Places in Hoonah–Angoon Census Area, Alaska
Log buildings and structures on the National Register of Historic Places in Alaska